Harold M. Schulweis (April 14, 1925 – December 18, 2014) was an American rabbi and author. He was the longtime spiritual Leader at Valley Beth Shalom in Encino, California.

Biography
Schulweis was born in the Bronx, New York, in 1925 to secular parents who respected Zionism and Jewish traditions.  His father was an editor of The Jewish Daily Forward.  His early Jewish education was influenced by his grandfather, Rabbi Avraham Rezak, who introduced him to the Talmud. In 1945, Schulweis graduated Yeshiva University with a degree in philosophy. Later Schulweis enrolled in the Jewish Theological Seminary, where he studied under Mordecai Kaplan and Abraham Joshua Heschel. Schulweis also studied philosophy at New York University, where he met his wife Malkah. He received a doctorate in theology from the Pacific School of Religion.

Rabbinical career
Schulweis's first pulpit was Temple Beth Abraham, a Conservative Jewish congregation in Oakland, California, in 1952. Among the innovations he introduced were the inclusion of women in minyanim and bat mitzvah ceremonies for girls. Instead of sermons, he used the allotted time for questions and answers. Schulweis has been criticized by the religious right for his interfaith and conversion programs, and open inclusion of homosexuals. The ultra nationalist Rabbi Meir Kahane criticized Schulweis for allowing a pro-PLO Arab Knesset member to speak at his synagogue, while refusing to extend the same opportunity to Kahane, who was also a Knesset member at the time. Newsweek magazine called him "the leading Conservative rabbi of his generation" and placed him 13th on their list of the Top 50 Rabbis in America. He was affiliated with the Conservative Movement and considered to have been a leading authority and theologian of Reconstructionist Judaism as well.

Human rights and Jewish activism
Schulweis was instrumental in the creation of the Chavurah movement in the late 1960s. He served as technical advisor for Judaism-themed episodes of The Simpsons.

In 1986 rabbi Harold Schulweis, Malka Drucker and Gay Block decided to document activities of non-Jewish Europeans who risked torture and death to save Jews during the Holocaust, a topic they considered both important and under-publicized. Their work would eventually led to a book (Rescuers: Portraits of Moral Courage in the Holocaust), as well as an exhibition of Block's photographs.

Also in 1986, Schulweis established the Jewish Foundation for the Righteous (originally called the Institute for Righteous Acts) to fulfill the traditional Jewish commitment to Hakarat HaTov, the searching out and recognition of goodness, by assisting righteous gentiles who are in need. The foundation started out funding eight rescuers, and that number quickly grew, reaching 1,750.  It currently supports more than 850 aged and needy rescuers in 23 countries. The foundation also pursues a national Holocaust education program. The goal of the program is to educate middle and high school teachers about the history of the Holocaust and to provide them with the resources to integrate this knowledge into their classrooms.

In 2004, Schulweis co-founded Jewish World Watch, a non-profit human rights watch group, with his long-time friend and congregant Janice Kamenir-Reznik.

Death
Schulweis had heart disease for many years, and died at his home in Encino, California on December 18, 2014.  He was 89.

Published works
 Evil and the Morality of God, (1983)
 In God's Mirror: Reflections and Essays, (1990)
 For Those Who Can't Believe: Overcoming the Obstacles to Faith, (1994)
 Meditations and Prayers for the Renewal of the Body and the Renewal of the Spirit, (2000)
 Finding Each Other in Judaism: Meditations on the Rites of Passage from Birth to Immortality, (2001)
 When You Lie Down and When You Rise Up: Nightstand Meditations, (2001)
 Conscience: The Duty to Obey and the Duty to Disobey, (2008)

Articles
We Dare Not Murder Memories of Genocide

Articles in Sh'ma Magazine
 Hope and Faith (2004)
 Confronting the Angel of Death (1996)
 When Lucy Cohen's Mother Is Not Jewish (1994)
 If I Were an Orthodox Rabbi (1989)
Jewish Isolation After the Holocaust (1988)
Polarizing Movements-and Our People (1985)
The Limits of Spero's Argument (1983)
When Ethics and Halacha Collide (1979)
We Need Women Conservative Rabbis (1979)
When Dissent is Not a Virtue (1976)
Full list on BJPA.org

Filmography 
Like Father, Like Clown - The Simpsons (Season Three, Episode 6) - Special Technical Consultant

Awards 

 2008: National Jewish Book Award for Conscience: The Duty to Obey and The Duty to Disobey

See also
American philosophy
List of American philosophers

References

External links

Jewish World Watch

1925 births
2014 deaths
American Conservative rabbis
American Reconstructionist rabbis
Philosophers of Judaism
American Jewish theologians
Jewish Theological Seminary of America alumni
Jewish Theological Seminary of America semikhah recipients
New York University alumni
Yeshiva University alumni
People from the Bronx
Pacific School of Religion alumni
20th-century American rabbis
21st-century American rabbis